The Château de Reux is a castle in Reux, Calvados, Normandy, France.

History
The castle was acquired by Édouard Alphonse James de Rothschild in 1868.

The garden includes a small pond. There is also artwork by Norbert Kricke.

As of 1777, it included faience by Bernard Palissy.

In the 1960s, German painter Francis Bott was commissioned to design the stained glass in the chapel.

References

Châteaux in Calvados (department)
Rothschild family residences